Missing Children Europe is an organisation which aims to ensure that every EU member state has the necessary procedures and regulations in place to deal with cases of missing and/or sexually exploited children, and are able to both provide support for the victims, and take steps to prevent future disappearances. It is an umbrella organization for 32 NGOs throughout Europe, 23 of which run a 116000 hotline for missing children.

History 
Missing Children Europe was established in 2001 by Child Focus (Belgium), La Mouette (France), Aurora (Italy), Initiative Vermisste Kinder (Germany) and Rat auf Draht (Austria). Missing Children Europe gained financial independence in 2008, as it obtained a grant from the European Commission.

Missing Children Europe was the driving force behind the launch of 116 000, an emergency number which provides immediate support when children go missing.

Constituent organizations
The 32 NGOs represented by Missing Children Europe are:
 Albania: ALO 116
 Austria: 147 Rat Auf Draht
 Belgium: Child Focus
 Bulgaria: Nadja Centre Foundation
 Croatia: Centre for missing and exploited children
 Cyprus: Consortium: SPAVO & HFC 
 Czech Republic: Cesta z krize, z. ů
 Denmark: Borns Vilkar
 Finland: Lasten perusoikeudet, Kaapatut Lapset ry
 France: APEV, Droit d'Enfance - 116000 Enfants Disparus, La Mouette
 Greece: The Smile of the Child
 Hungary: Kék Vonal
 Ireland: ISPCC
 Italy: SOS II Telefono Azzurro Onlus
 Latvia: Bezvests.lv
 Lithuania: Missing Persons' Families Support Centre 
 Poland: ITAKA Foundation
 Portugal: Instituto de Apoio à Criança, APCD
 Romania: Salvati Copiii
 Serbia: Astra
 Slovakia: Linka detskej istoty, n. o.
 Spain: Fundación ANAR
 Switzerland: Missing Children Switzerland, Fondation Suisse du Service Social International
 The Netherlands: The International Child Abduction Centre
 Ukraine: NGO Magnolia
 United Kingdom: Missing People
Missing Children Europe's members are experts in missing children covering prevention, support to missing children and parents, and cooperation with national law enforcement in the search of missing children.

Funding 
Missing Children Europe's receives a core operating grant from the European Commission's CERV Programme for its coordination of the 116000 European missing child hotlines network. MCE coordinates EU funded projects under the CERV, JUST, AMIF, and ISF programmes, and further receives project funding on issues of running away, unaccompanied minors, international child abductions and grooming and online sexual exploitation from various foundations. The remainder is collected through fundraising events, structural partnerships and membership fees.

Notes

External links 

International organizations based in Europe